Tamiḻakam (Tamil: தமிழகம்) refers to the geographical region inhabited by the ancient Tamil people, covering the southernmost region of the Indian subcontinent. Tamilakam covered today's Tamil Nadu, Kerala, Puducherry, Lakshadweep and southern parts of Andhra Pradesh and Karnataka. Traditional accounts and the Tolkāppiyam referred to these territories as a single cultural area, where Tamil was the natural language and permeated the culture of all its inhabitants. The ancient Tamil country was divided into kingdoms. The best known among them were the Cheras, Cholas, Pandyans and Pallavas. During the Sangam period, Tamil culture began to spread outside Tamilakam. Ancient Tamil settlements were also established in Sri Lanka (Sri Lankan Tamils) and the Maldives (Giravarus).

It is noted that during the entire Prehistorical, Classical, Middle and Early Modern ages, the region of Tamilakam remained non-invadable and unconquered by the Northern Indo-Aryan dynasties ranged from the Maurya Empire till the Mughal Empire.

In contemporary India, Tamil politicians and orators often use the name Tamilakam to refer to Tamil Nadu alone.

Etymology

"Tamiḻakam" is a portmanteau of a word and suffix from the Tamil language, namely Tamiḻ and -akam. It can be roughly translated as the "home of Tamil". According to Kamil Zvelebil, the term seems to be the most ancient term used to designate Tamil territory in the Indian subcontinent.

The Periplus of the Erythraean Sea, as well as Ptolemy's writings, mention the term "Limyrike" which corresponds to the Malabar Coast of south-western India. Based on a misinterpretation of the Roman map Tabula Peutingeriana and the possible phonetic connection between the words "Damir-" and "Tamil", some modern scholars have wrongly mentioned Limyrike as "Damirica" (or "Damirice"), considering it as a synonym of "Tamilakam". The "Damirice" mentioned in the Tabula Peutingeriana actually refers to an area between the Himalayas and the Ganges.

Extent 

The term "Tamilakam" appears to be the most ancient term used for designating the Tamil territory. The earliest sources to mention it include Purananuru 168.18 and Patiṟṟuppattu Patikam 2.5. The Specific Preface (cirappuppayiram) of the more ancient text Tolkāppiyam mentions the terms tamil-kuru nal-lulakam ("the beautiful world [where] Tamil is spoken") and centamil ... nilam ("the territory ... of refined Tamil"). However, this preface, which is of uncertain date, is definitely a later addition to the original Tolkāppiyam. According to the Tolkāppiyam preface, "the virtuous land in which Tamil is spoken as the mother tongue lies between the northern Venkata hill and the southern Kumari."

The Silappadikaram (c. 2nd century CE) defines the Tamilakam as follows:

While these ancient texts do not clearly define the eastern and western boundaries of the Tamilakam, scholars assume that these boundaries were the seas, which may explain their omission from the ancient definition. The ancient Tamilakam thus included the present-day Kerala. However, it excluded the present-day Tamil-inhabited territory in the North-East of Sri Lanka.

Subdivisions

Kingdoms

Approximately during the period between 600 BCE to 300 CE, Tamiḻakam was ruled by the three Tamil dynasties: the Chola dynasty, the Pandyan dynasty and the Chera dynasty. There were also a few independent chieftains, the Velirs (Satyaputra). The earliest datable references to the Tamil kingdoms are in inscriptions from the 3rd century BCE during the time of the Maurya Empire.

The Pandyan dynasty ruled parts of South India until the late 17th century. The heartland of the Pandyas was the fertile valley of the Vaigai River. They initially ruled their country from Korkai, a seaport on the southernmost tip of the Indian Peninsula, and in later times moved to Madurai. The Chola dynasty ruled from before the Sangam period (~3rd century BCE) until the 13th century in central Tamil Nadu. The heartland of the Cholas was the fertile valley of the Kaveri. The Chera dynasty ruled from before the Sangam period (~3rd century) until the 12th century over an area corresponding to modern-day western Tamil Nadu and Kerala.

The Vealirs (Vēḷir) were minor dynastic kings and aristocratic chieftains in Tamiḻakam in the early historic period of South India.

Nations of Tamilakam
Tamiḻakam was divided into political regions called Perunadu or "Great country", "nadu" means country.

There were three important political regions which were Chera Nadu, Chola Nadu and Pandya Nadu. Along these three there were two more political regions of Athiyaman Nadu (Sathyaputha) and Thamirabharani Nadu (Then Paandi) which were later on absorbed into Chera resp. Pandya Nadu by 3rd century BCE. Tondai Nadu which was under Chola Nadu, later emerged as independent Pallava Nadu by 6th century CE.

Again Tamilakam were divided into 13 socio-geographical regions called Nadu or "country". Each of this Nadu had their own dialect of Tamil.

Thenpandi Nadu
Panri Nadu
Kuda Nadu
Punal Nadu
Puzhi Nadu
Venadu
Aruva Nadu
Kakkanadu
Kuttanadu
Aruva Vadathalai Nadu
Sida Nadu
Erumai Nadu
Malai Nadu
Tulu Nadu

Nations outside Tamilakam

Some other Nadus are also mentioned in Tamil literature which were not part of Tamilakam, but the countries traded with them in ancient times.

Tamil speaking lands:
Eela Nadu (Eelam)
Naga Nadu or Yazh Kuthanadu (Jaffna Peninsula)
Vanni Nadu (Vanni region)

Other:
Vengi Nadu
Chavaka Nadu (Java)
Kadara Nadu (Kedah)
Kalinga Nadu
Singhala Nadu
Vadugu Nadu
Kannada Nadu (Land of Kannada people)
Telunka Nadu (Land of Telugu people)
Kolla Nadu
Vanka Nadu
Magadha Nadu
Kucala Nadu
Konkana Nadu
Kampocha Nadu (Cambodia)
Palantivu Nadu (Maldives)
Kupaka Nadu
Marattha Nadu
Vatuka Nadu
Tinmaitivu (Andaman and Nicobar Islands)

Geocultural unity

Although the area covered by the term "Tamilakam" was divided among multiple kingdoms, its occurrence in the ancient literature implies that the region's inhabitants shared a cultural or ethnic identity, or at least regarded themselves as distinct from their neighbours. The ancient Tamil inscriptions, ranging from 5th century BCE to 3rd century CE, are also considered as linguistic evidence for distinguishing Tamilakam from the rest of South India. The ancient non-Tamil inscriptions, such as those of the northern kings Ashoka and Kharavela, also allude to the distinct identity of the region. For example, Ashoka's inscriptions refer to the independent states lying beyond the southern boundary of his kingdom, and Kharavdela's Hathigumpha inscription refers to the destruction of a "confederacy of Tamil powers".

Cultural influence

With the advent of the early historical period in South India and the ascent of the three Tamil kingdoms in South India in the 6th century BCE, Tamil culture began to spread outside Tamiḻakam. Prior to 3rd century BCE, more Tamil settlers arrived in Sri Lanka. The Annaicoddai seal, dated to the 3rd century BCE, contains a bilingual inscription in Tamil-Brahmi.Though Tamils have been living in Sri Lanka since the Ancient era at least with universally accepted dates of at least the 10th century BCE showing signs of Tamil civilisation in Sri Lanka Excavations in the area of Tissamaharama in southern Sri Lanka have unearthed locally issued coins produced between the second century BCE and the second century CE, some of which carry local Tamil personal names written in early Tamil letters, which suggest that local Tamil merchants were present and actively involved in trade along the southern coast of Sri Lanka by the late classical period. Around 237 BCE, "two adventurers from southern India" established the first Tamil rule at Sri Lanka. In 145 BCE Elara, a Chola general or prince known as Ellāḷaṉ took over the throne at Anuradhapura and ruled for forty-four years. Dutugamunu, a Sinhalese, started a war against him, defeated him, and took over the throne. Tamil Kings have been dated in Sri Lanka to at least the 3rd century BCE.

Religion

Shaivism, Vaishnavism, Dravidian folk religion, Jains, and Buddhists have coexisted in Tamil country for at least as early as the second century BCE.

Economy

Agriculture

Industry

See also
Sources of ancient Tamil history
Chronology of Tamil history
History of Tamil Nadu
History of Kerala

Notes

References

Sources

Printed sources

 
 
 
 
 
 
 
 
 
 
 
 
 
 
 
 
 
 
 
 
 
 

 
Ancient Tamil Nadu
1st-millennium BC establishments in India
Regions of Asia
Regions of Karnataka
Historical regions